The 1999–2000 Sussex County Football League season was the 75th in the history of Sussex County Football League a football competition in England.

Division One

Division One featured 18 clubs which competed in the division last season, along with two new clubs, promoted from Division Two:
Sidley United
Three Bridges

League table

Division Two

Division Two featured 14 clubs which competed in the division last season, along with four new clubs.
Clubs relegated from Division One:
Broadbridge Heath
Hailsham Town
Clubs promoted from Division Three:
Oving Social Club, who also changed name to Oving
Westfield

Also, Crawley Down Village changed name to Crawley Down.

League table

Division Three

Division Three featured twelve clubs which competed in the division last season, along with four new clubs:
Bosham, joined from the West Sussex League
Crowborough Athletic, relegated from Division Two
Newhaven, relegated from Division Two
Seaford, joined from the East Sussex League

Also, St Francis Hospital changed name St Francis.

League table

References

1999-2000
1999–2000 in English football leagues